Backgammon (also released as Blues March) is an album by drummer Art Blakey and The Jazz Messengers recorded in 1976 and released on the Roulette label.

Reception

Allmusic awarded the album 2½ stars.

Track listing 
 "Uranus" (Walter Davis) – 6:55   
 "Whisper Not" (Benny Golson) – 6:30   
 "Backgammon" (Davis) – 5:25   
 "Blues March" (Golson) – 5:27   
 "Georgia on My Mind" (Hoagy Carmichael, Stuart Gorrell) – 5:13   
 "Third World Express" (Kasa Allah) – 7:47   
 "Namfulay" (Ladji Camara) – 4:02   
 "I Can't Get Started" (Ira Gershwin, Vernon Duke) – 6:47

Personnel 
Art Blakey – drums
Bill Hardman – trumpet
Ladji Camara  – flute, vocals (track 7)
David Schnitter – tenor saxophone
Albert Dailey – piano
Chin Suzuki – bass

References 

Art Blakey albums
The Jazz Messengers albums
1976 albums
Roulette Records albums
Backgammon
Works about games